Joe Ira Clark (born June 15, 1975) is an American professional basketball player. Born in Fort Worth, Texas, he is 2.03 meters tall and weighs 103 kilograms.

He played for Efes Pilsen and Ülkerspor and won Turkish Basketball League titles with both Istanbul arch rivals. After the end of 2005–06 season, Ülker was shut down and merged with Fenerbahçe, and he transferred to Fenerbahçe as all the current players of Ülkerspor and won his third Turkish Basketball League Championship with the club.

He also played for Daegu Orions in South Korea, Makedonikos BC in Greece and UNICS Kazan in Russia.

In the 2010–11 NBL season, Clark played for the Gold Coast Blaze.

On November 7, 2011, Clark was signed by a South Korean basketball club, Seoul Samsung Thunders who released Peter John Ramos the day before.

He currently plays for Ulsan Mobis Phoebus of the Korean Basketball League.

Honors in Turkey 
 2002–03: Turkish Basketball League Champions with Efes Pilsen
 2005–06: Turkish Basketball League Champions with Ülkerspor
 2006–07: Turkish Basketball League Champions with Fenerbahçe

References

National Baseball League: Ira Clark Retrieved December 9, 2010

External links
Facebook Page
KBL Page
Euroleague.net Page
TBLStat.net Profile

1975 births
Living people
American expatriate basketball people in Australia
American expatriate basketball people in Greece
American expatriate basketball people in Italy
American expatriate basketball people in Russia
American expatriate basketball people in South Korea
American expatriate basketball people in Turkey
American men's basketball players
Anadolu Efes S.K. players
Basketball players from Texas
BC UNICS players
Suwon KT Sonicboom players
Centers (basketball)
Changwon LG Sakers players
Fabriano Basket players
Fenerbahçe men's basketball players
Gold Coast Blaze players
Goyang Carrot Jumpers players
Junior college men's basketball players in the United States
Makedonikos B.C. players
Power forwards (basketball)
Seoul Samsung Thunders players
Sportspeople from Fort Worth, Texas
Texas Longhorns men's basketball players
Ülker G.S.K. basketball players
Ulsan Hyundai Mobis Phoebus players
United States Basketball League players
American expatriate basketball people in the Philippines
Philippine Basketball Association imports
Tanduay Rhum Masters players